Quint Jansen (born 10 September 1990) is a Dutch footballer who plays as a defender for Norwegian Eliteserien side Sandefjord.

Career statistics

Club

References

External links

1990 births
Living people
Association football defenders
Dutch footballers
Dutch expatriate footballers
Expatriate footballers in Norway
Dutch expatriate sportspeople in Norway
Mjøndalen IF players
Norwegian First Division players
Norwegian Third Division players
Eliteserien players
Footballers from Zaanstad